The Primetime Emmy Award for Outstanding Reality Program was a category award handed out annually at the Creative Arts Emmy Award ceremony.

In 2014, Outstanding Reality Program was separated into two categories – Outstanding Structured Reality Program and Outstanding Unstructured Reality Program.

Winners and nominations

2000s

2010s

References

See also
 Critics' Choice Television Award for Best Reality Series

Reality Program
American reality television series